"Angelito" is a 1964 song written by René Herrera and René Ornelas, known as René y René. The song was one of the duo's greatest successes and was quickly covered by several other artists:
Trini Lopez 1964
The Bowmen	1964
Herb Alpert's Tijuana Brass   	1965
Martin Denny	1964
Pierre Lalonde	1967

References

1964 songs